Anders Aronsson  (May 12, 1885 – ?) was a Swedish politician. He was a member of the Centre Party, and was elected to the Swedish parliament (upper house) in 1939.

Members of the Riksdag from the Centre Party (Sweden)
1885 births
Year of death missing
Members of the Första kammaren